The Guerrero Correctional Institution (Institución Correccional Guerrero) is a prison for men located in Aguadilla, Puerto Rico, owned and operated by the Puerto Rico Department of Corrections and Rehabilitation.  With a stated capacity of 944 inmates, it's among the three largest prisons in the territory.

The facility was first opened in 1986 as a Community Therapy mental health unit (Comunidad Terapéutica de Guerrero) of the Puerto Rico Department of Health.  It became a correctional facility in March 1997.  As of 2008 about a third of its inmates were pre-trial detainees, and the others were serving longer sentences at minimum security.  

From 2002 to 2008, some 53 Guerrero inmates died inside the institution, all but one of them pre-trial detainees, and 73% of them within their first week behind bars.  An extensive report by the ACLU of Puerto Rico blamed the abuse of a horse tranquilizer, Xylazine, among inmates, and lack of appropriate medical attention and lack of accountability among prison officials.

References

External links 

 ACLU Puerto Rico report in its entirety (Spanish language)
 executive summary of report (English language)

Prisons in Puerto Rico
Buildings and structures in Aguadilla, Puerto Rico
1986 establishments in Puerto Rico